Allford may refer to:

People with the family name
Grant Allford (born 1950), Australian rules footballer
Simon Allford (born 1961), British architect

Architectural firm
Allford Hall Monaghan Morris, British architectural firm based in London, founded in 1989

See also
Alford (disambiguation)